The 1984–85 Washington Capitals season was the Washington Capitals eleventh season in the National Hockey League (NHL).

Offseason

Regular season
Coming off their most successful season in their NHL history (48 wins, 101 points, 2nd place in the Patrick Division), the Capitals were expected to take over leadership of the division from the New York Islanders, whose fading dynasty was given a blow after the Oilers topped them in the 1984 Stanley Cup Finals.

Instead, despite a solid start to the season, the Caps were struggling in the early going to keep up with the surprising Philadelphia Flyers. With a surge around the holidays, Washington ended up snagging first place and with the help of easy games throughout January, extended their division lead to double-digit points by the start of February.

However, the Flyers came breathing down the Caps' necks from there. On February 9, Washington led Philly by 11 points, but a last-second loss to the Flyers at the Capital Centre triggered another battle for the division title.

Although the Capitals didn't falter over the remaining games of the season, they were unable to hold off their scorching neighbors to the north — dropping a key pair of games in a home-and-home set on March 7 at the Spectrum (9–6) and March 8 at home (4–2) – which drew the clubs into a tie for first. Key losses at home to Boston and on the road at Hartford sealed their fate as the Flyers wrapped up the Patrick on March 28 with the Capitals a distant 10 points off the pace.

Despite winning 46 games and posting another 101 point campaign, the Capitals wound up 12 points behind Philly, and won only once in seven games against them (1–5–1).

That didn't take away from the career performances of Mike Gartner and Bobby Carpenter, who became the first Capitals teammates to post concurrent 50 goal seasons. Both Gartner (50) and Carpenter (53) posted career-highs in goal scoring and led a potent offense which tallied 322 times.

Final standings

Schedule and results

Playoffs

Round 1: (P2) Washington Capitals vs. (P3) New York Islanders

Player statistics

Regular season
Scoring

Goaltending

Playoffs
Scoring

Goaltending

Note: GP = Games played; G = Goals; A = Assists; Pts = Points; +/- = Plus/minus; PIM = Penalty minutes; PPG=Power-play goals; SHG=Short-handed goals; GWG=Game-winning goals
      MIN=Minutes played; W = Wins; L = Losses; T = Ties; GA = Goals against; GAA = Goals against average; SO = Shutouts;

Awards and records

Transactions

Draft picks
Washington's draft picks at the 1984 NHL Entry Draft held at the Montreal Forum in Montreal, Quebec.

Farm teams

See also
 1984–85 NHL season

References

External links
 

Washington Capitals seasons
Wash
Wash
Washing
Washing